The Allenton State Wildlife Area is a wildlife area in Wisconsin along the East Branch of the Rock River (Mississippi River) tributary of the Mississippi River in western Washington County, Wisconsin. The area was once a glacial lake and is now a wooded bottomland. It is popular with birders and is part of the Great Wisconsin Birding and Nature Trail. Theresa Marsh and its state wildlife area is to the park's north.

The wildlife area includes habitat used by sandhill crane, marsh wren, swamp sparrow and snow geese. Rare species include the rough-legged hawk, northern harrier, bobolink and American bittern.

See also
Theresa Marsh Wildlife Area

References

External Links
 U.S. Geological Survey Map at the U.S. Geological Survey Map Website. Retrieved May 2nd, 2022.

Protected areas of Washington County, Wisconsin
State Wildlife Areas of Wisconsin